Lausanne Hockey Club is an ice hockey team based in the city of Lausanne, Switzerland, which competes in the National League (NL) - the top tier of Swiss hockey. During the 2004–05 NHL lockout, the HC Lausanne signed National Hockey League players Martin St. Louis and Andy Roach.

The team plays its home games in the 10,000-seat Vaudoise Aréna.

History
Founded in 1922, the Lausanne Hockey Club is one of the oldest clubs in Switzerland. They played for sixteen years at Chalet-à-Gobet, in the city heights. In 1938, LHC moved their headquarters to Montchoisi where, in 1941, they merged with Star HC to become the Montchoisi Hockey Club. On November 6, 1949, the team of Lausanne chose their original name: Lausanne Hockey Club. It is with this name that they started off in the Swiss national league.

Relegated to Nationalliga B in 1954, they powered back to the Nationalliga A on March 2, 1957 and remained there until 1961. For the next seventeen years, LHC remained at the Nationalliga B level where they had occasional success. On February 18, 1978, in front of over 7,000 fans, Lausanne Hockey Club obtained promotion to Nationalliga A, defeating HC Davos 8 goals to 4. After three seasons spent in the highest league, LHC, following the loss of a player in a car accident, was relegated to NLB. They remained there from 1981 to 1984 before falling to the 1. Liga while also moving to the International Ice Center at Malley (CIGM) where they still play today. They then played one season in first League (84-85) and made a round trip to NLB (85-86), to be back in the first League. Three years later they reached the finals in 1989 and obtain their promotion to NLB.

In 1992, the club's survival was threatened by a bankruptcy. The team saved itself from relegation to the 1. Liga (season 1992-1993). The season 1993-1994 saw participation in the finals to access the national League A, finals played in five games against Rapperswil, the latter winning it over. At the beginning of the 1994-1995 season, Lausanne Hockey Club was designated as the Nationalliga B favorite to access the NLA. Against GCK Lions during the finals and after five games, the decisive match was won by Lausanne 8 to 0. In the 1995-1996 season, after a series of losses the club decided to fire their head coach. The change didn't prevent Lausanne from being relegated to NLB at the end of the season. During the following four seasons, the LHC occupied the middle of the NLB ranking until 2000-2001 when they were at the head of the championship during almost the whole season. Lausanne won the title of champion of NLB and defeated HC La Chaux-de-Fonds for the promotion games. Winning against the HCC in six matches, LHC was back in NLA for the 2001-2002 season.

After a relegation in the 2004–05 season, Lausanne played the role of “favorite” for the other teams of the NLB. In April 2007, two Canadian's and former hockey players Barry Alter and Ken Lockett were introduced to the public as new majority owners of the club to help the club through financial difficulties. With the introduction of former coach Jim Koleff to the ownership group, later represented by his wife following his death, Lausanne was also backed by Hugh Quennec with interest already in fellow professional club, Genève-Servette HC.

The club tried to reach the NLA once again through promotion, but failed twice in the promotion games 2008–09 and the 2009–10 seasons, losing both times against EHC Biel in seven games. In the 2012–13 season, after a slow start into the regular season, Lausanne won the NLB championship for the 7th time, defeating EHC Olten in the play-off final. In the following promotion games, Lausanne defeated the SCL Tigers in six games to reach again the NLA for the 2013–14 season.

In 2013, following the series of promotion / relegation blocks against the SCL Tigers, the club moved up in the National League A with four wins and two defeats. During the 2014–15 season, their second in the NLA, the team averaged 6,711 spectators per game, ranking them third in the league in term of attendance.

In February 2016, American businessman Ken Stickney acquired the majority of shares of Lausanne from Quennec. Stickney was previously president of EHC Kloten and a member of Avenir Sport Entertainment LLC (ASE), the owner of the club.

In April 2016, the Lausanne released Danish head coach Heinz Ehlers after failing to make the playoffs for the 2015–16 season. Ehlers had achieved with the playoff appearances in 2014 and 2015, the largest club successes in the NLA until then. His was succeeded by Daniel Ratushny on April 26, 2016. Under Ratushny, the team used an overly defensive style capitalizing on opportunistic offense. Enjoying initial success they finished the 2016–17 regular season in fourth place. In the playoffs, however, LHC did not find victory in the quarter-final's against HC Davos, suffering a series sweep.

Following 12 points in their first 10 games in the 2017–18 season, Ratushny was let go of his coaching duties on 11 October 2017. He was replaced on an interim basis by former Lausanne youth coach and fellow Canadian, Yves Sarault, and later announced to remain for the remainder of the season. However, with the club still struggling into the new year placing third from the bottom of the league, a second coaching change was announced as Sarault was replaced by John Fust on 8 February 2018.

Venues
The home games of the Lausanne HC were played in the CIG de Malley from 1984 to 2017 and had an official capacity of 8,000 spectators. While waiting for completion of a new arena in the 2017–18 season, Lausanne moved to a temporarily built ice hockey arena known as the 2.0 Malley, which sat 6,700 spectators. It was established as the largest temporary ice hockey arena in the world.

The new arena opened in September 2019. The new ice rink received the sponsorship name Vaudoise Aréna, after the insurance company Vaudoise.

Players

Current roster

Honored members

References

External links
 

Ice hockey clubs established in 1922
Ice hockey teams in Switzerland
Sport in Lausanne